The men's javelin throw at the 1958 European Athletics Championships was held in Stockholm, Sweden, at Stockholms Olympiastadion on 23 and 24 August 1958.

Medalists

Results

Final
24 August

Qualification
23 August

Participation
According to an unofficial count, 19 athletes from 11 countries participated in the event.

 (1)
 (2)
 (2)
 (1)
 (2)
 (2)
 (2)
 (2)
 (2)
 (1)
 (2)

References

Javelin throw
Javelin throw at the European Athletics Championships